A trophy is an award of mostly symbolic value, earned by the winner of a competition.

Trophy or trophies may also refer to:
Trophy wife, a term commonly used to describe any wife who is considered a status symbol
Trophy (architectural), an architectural ornament
PlayStation Network Trophies, awards for achieving goals in PlayStation video games (introduced with the PlayStation 3)
Tropaion or tropaeum, ancient Roman victory monument or trophy
Tropaeum Traiani, the Trophy of Trajan, in modern Romania
Tropaeum Alpium, the Trophy of the Alps, in modern France
War trophy, property seized from the enemy as a result of a military victory
Trophy hunting, an item, such as a stuffed bear or a deer head, kept by a hunter as a souvenir of the successful hunt
Trophy (countermeasure), an Israeli military vehicle active protection system Me'il Ruach, also called Windbreaker, currently fitted to the Merkava 4 MBT and Namer heavy IFV
Tropaeum, a genus of cephalopod mollusca
Trophy Mountain, a mountain in British Columbia, Canada
a 6-row malting barley variety

Arts and entertainment

Film and television
Trophy (film), a 2017 American documentary about trophy hunting
"Trophy" (The Shield), a 2006 television episode

Music
Trophy (Made Out of Babies album), 2005
Trophy (Sunny Sweeney album), 2017
Trophies (Apollo Brown and O.C. album), 2012
Trophies, an album by Paper Lions, 2010
"Trophy", a song by Bat for Lashes from Fur and Gold, 2006
"Trophy", a song by Charli XCX from Vroom Vroom, 2016
"Trophies" (song), by Drake, 2014